The Sumgayit FK 2011–12 season was Sumgayit's first Azerbaijan Premier League season, and second season in their history. The finished the season in 12th place, bottom of the Premier League, and reached they First Round of the Azerbaijan Cup where they were defeated by Qarabağ.

Squad

Transfers

In

Loans in

Released

Competitions

Premier League

Regular Stage

Results summary

Results

League table

Relegation Group

Results summary

Results

League table

Azerbaijan Cup

Squad statistics

Appearances and goals

|-
|colspan="14"|Players who left Sumgayit during the season:

|}

Goal scorers

Disciplinary record

References

Azerbaijani football clubs 2011–12 season